Airdrie and Shotts is a constituency of the UK House of Commons, located in central Scotland within the North Lanarkshire council area. It elects one Member of Parliament (MP) at least once every five years using the first-past-the-post system of voting.

The constituency has existed since 1997; however, it underwent significant boundary changes in 2005. Before 2015, it could have been described as a safe seat for the Labour Party, who held it with a majority of over 12,000 votes until Neil Gray of the Scottish National Party (SNP) was elected at that year's general election. Former MPs for the constituency include: Pamela Nash, former Baby of the House, John Reid, former Labour Home Secretary and Defence Secretary, and Helen Liddell, former Labour Scottish Secretary.

It is a generally working-class, urban seat, and contains the towns of Airdrie, Calderbank, Chapelhall, Glenmavis and Shotts.

From 2015 to 2021 the member was Gray from the SNP. He resigned in March 2021 to run for a seat in the Scottish Parliament, triggering a by-election.

Constituency profile
The majority of this constituency maintains the boundaries of its predecessor. From the North Lanarkshire constituency come Holytown and Newarthill. This seat is positioned on either side of the M8 motorway to Glasgow. Small semi-urban towns such as Shotts (including Stane and Dykehead) were added to Airdrie in the 1997 redistribution to form this seat, the predecessor of which was Monklands East. An area in the eastern part of Coatbridge is also part of the constituency.

Electoral Calculus describes the seat as "Traditional", characterised by working class people with lower levels of income and formal education.

Boundaries and history 

1997–2005: The Monklands District electoral divisions of Airdrie North and Airdrie South, and the Motherwell District electoral division of Fortissat.

2005–present: The North Lanarkshire Council wards of academy, Airdrie Central, Airdrie North, Airdrie South, Benhar, Calderbank, Chapelhall, Clarkston, Craigneuk and Petersburn, Dykehead, Holytown, New Monkland West, Newarthill, Newmains, North Cairnhill and Coatdyke, Plains and Caldercruix, Salsburgh, South East Cairnhill and Gartlea, Stane, and Whinhall. In 2007 these were converted into multi-member wards, with the following falling within the constituency: Airdrie Central, Airdrie North, Airdrie South, Fortissat, Mossend and Holytown (part), Murdostoun (part).

The 2005 changes saw the seat lose some territory to Motherwell and Wishaw whilst gaining part of Hamilton North and Bellshill. It proved to be a Labour Party stronghold from its creation until the Scottish National Party gained it at the 2015 general election, with Neil Gray winning the seat from Pamela Nash by 8,779 votes. Gray's majority dipped to just 195 in the 2017 election. However, in the 2019 election he won by 5,201 votes.

On 24 March 2021 it was formally announced that Neil Gray had officially stood down as the Member of Parliament for Airdrie and Shotts to contest the 2021 Scottish Parliament election seat of the same name.

Members of Parliament

Election results

Elections in the 2020s

Elections in the 2010s

Elections in the 2000s

Elections in the 1990s

See also
 Scottish Westminster Constituencies

External links 
Politics Resources (Election results from 1922 onwards)
Electoral Calculus (Election results from 1955 onwards)

References 

Westminster Parliamentary constituencies in Scotland
Constituencies of the Parliament of the United Kingdom established in 1997
Politics of North Lanarkshire
Airdrie, North Lanarkshire